John Arthur Thompson (1913–2002) was an Australian Old Testament scholar and biblical archaeologist.

Thompson studied at the University of Queensland, the University of Melbourne and the University of Cambridge, gaining degrees in science, the arts, and theology. For a number of years he taught chemistry and physics. He taught at the University of Melbourne's School of Middle Eastern Studies (1947–1956), and the Baptist Theological College of New South Wales (from 1957). He was the first director of the Australian Institute of Archaeology in Melbourne, from 1947. During 1950–51 he was an honorary Fellow of the American Schools of Oriental Research at the Jerusalem school and worked at the archaeological sites of Roman Jericho and Dibon.

Thompson wrote commentaries on Deuteronomy, 1 and 2 Chronicles, and Jeremiah. He was one of the translators of the New Living Translation.

He also wrote "Archaeology and the Pre-Christian Centuries" (Grand Rapids: Eerdmans, 1958). (Library of Congress, 58-13061)

Works

Books

References

External links
Dr JA Thompson

1913 births
2002 deaths
Australian biblical scholars
Old Testament scholars
Bible commentators
Australian archaeologists
University of Queensland alumni
University of Melbourne alumni
Academic staff of the University of Melbourne
Alumni of the University of Cambridge
Translators of the Bible into English
20th-century translators
20th-century archaeologists